Madhya Pradesh State Highway 11 (MP SH 11) is a State Highway running from Chitrakoot town near (UP border) via Majhgawa, Kothi, Satna, Uchehara, Maihar, Bhadanpur, Badera, Barhi, Khitoli, Parasi, Umaria, Shahpura, Kathotya till Chabi town in Mandla district.

It is an important highway which connects important towns of Eastern Madhya Pradesh.

See Also
List of state highways in Madhya Pradesh

References

State Highways in Madhya Pradesh